Oly may refer to:

 Oly, informal name for Olympia, Washington, United States
 OLY, postnominals granted to participants in the Olympics

People with the name
 Oly (born 1992), American singer-songwriter and musician
 Oly Hicks (born 1968), ice hockey coach
 Oly Ilunga Kalenga (born 1960), Belgian-Congolese medical doctor and government minister
 Oly Slivets, Russian skier

Transport
 Ockley railway station, Surrey, England, National Rail station code
 Olympic station, Hong Kong, MTR station code

See also
 Oly Rollers, an American roller derby league
 Oli (disambiguation)
 Olly (disambiguation)